Luigi Pasetti (born 9 September 1945, in Francolino) is a retired Italian professional footballer who played as a defender.

1945 births
Living people
Italian footballers
Serie A players
S.P.A.L. players
Juventus F.C. players
Palermo F.C. players
Piacenza Calcio 1919 players
Association football defenders